The following are the national records in track cycling in Lithuania maintained by the Lithuanian Cycling Federation (LDSF).

Men

Women

See also
 List of Lithuanian records

References

External links
 LDSF web site

records
Cycling
Track cycling
Lithuanian